Citizens Telecommunications Company of Nebraska provides local telephone service in Nebraska and some rural communities in northern Kansas.

History
Citizens Telecommunications Company of Nebraska was founded in 1999. It was created to take over former GTE Midwest operations that GTE sold off as part of a larger plan to sell telephone lines nationwide prior to its acquisition by Bell Atlantic

Citizens Utilities, upon acquiring assets of the former Frontier Corporation, began doing business as Frontier Communications. The company adopted the Frontier name for all of its local telephone operations, at which point Citizens in Nebraska began doing business as Frontier Communications of Nebraska.

Frontier provides telephone services to major communities such as Kearney through Citizens of Nebraska.

References

See also
GTE Midwest
Frontier Communications
List of Frontier Communications operating companies

Frontier Communications
Telecommunications companies of the United States
History of telecommunications in the United States
Telecommunications companies established in 1999
Companies based in Nebraska
Kearney, Nebraska
Communications in Kansas
Communications in Nebraska
1999 establishments in Nebraska